Gerry Salim Laurens (born in Surabaya, 19 April 1997), is a motorcycle racer from Indonesia.

Racing Career 
Gerry started his career in the mid-2000s. In 2011, he won the Motoprix National Championship in the MP6 class. The following year saw him won the Honda One Make Race series in both underbone 110cc and 125cc classes. With him rising through the ranks, Astra Honda Racing Team recruited him to be a part of their rider development program.

Asia Road Racing Championship
Gerry tried his hands on international racing scene by competing in 2013 Asia Dream Cup. He finished the series as a runner-up. He also raced in GP3 class of All-Japan Championship, ranked 5th, and in Asia Talent Cup for 3 seasons (2015-2017). He won the 2016 Qatar round. In overall, Gerry ranked 6th in 2015, 6th in 2016 and 7th in 2017.

Gerry was signed to Astra Honda Racing and raced in Supersport 600cc class in Asia Road Racing Championship (ARRC). In 2016, his first season, he won 2 races in the Indonesian round at Sentul, and ranked 9th in that season. Astra Honda later called him up to race in the lesser class, (AP250) aboard a Honda CBR250RR. Gerry dominated the class with 7 victories out of 12 races in 6 rounds. He secured the Asian championship at the final round at Chang International Circuit

CEV Moto3 Junior World Championship & Red Bull MotoGP Rookies Cup
Gerry's success on Asia level paved his way to a higher class, CEV Moto3 Junior World Championship and Red Bull Rookies. In CEV Moto3, he got his first point at Circuito de Albacete and finished his first season in 35th position. Gerry ranked 17th out of 24 riders with 23 points in Red Bull Rookies.

Moto2 World Championship
Gerry is scheduled to race in FIM CEV Moto2 European Championship for Astra Honda Racing Team as a replacement for Dimas Ekky Pratama, who moves up to Moto2 Class. He completed in 2019 Moto2 Aragon GP also as a substitute for Dimas who was injured at Idemitsu Honda Team Asia where he finished 29th.

Moto3 World Championship
Honda Team Asia called Gerry up to replace their injured regular rider, Ai Ogura, ahead of 2019 Italian motorcycle Grand Prix. Gerry finished the race in 16th position.

Return to ARRC 
Initially, Gerry was recruited by Honda Asia Dream Racing team to race in Asia Superbike (ASB1000) class of ARRC with Malaysian rider Zaqhwan Zaidi as a teammate for 2020 season. However, the season was cancelled due to COVID-19 pandemic. He eventually made his debut in the class in 2022 as the series resumed.

He also raced in 2022 Suzuka 8 Hours for the same team alongside Zaqhwan and Helmi Azman. The trio finished 11th in the race.

Personal life
Gerry comes from a family that has racing background. His father, Gunawan Salim, is a former motorcycle racer and his brother Tommy Salim, also has the same profession as him. Tommy raced in 2018 Suzuka 4 Hours with M. Febriansyah under Astra Honda Racing Team flag and the pair finished 4th.

Gerry is known by his nickname “Si Bonek” and is a fan of Persebaya Surabaya.

Career statistics

Red Bull MotoGP Rookies Cup

Races by year
(key) (Races in bold indicate pole position; races in italics indicate fastest lap)

FIM CEV Moto3 Junior World Championship

Races by year
(key) (Races in bold indicate pole position, races in italics indicate fastest lap)

FIM CEV Moto2 European Championship

Races by year
(key) (Races in bold indicate pole position, races in italics indicate fastest lap)

Grand Prix motorcycle racing

By season

By class

Races by year
(key) (Races in bold indicate pole position; races in italics indicate fastest lap)

Asia Superbike 1000

Races by year
(key) (Races in bold indicate pole position; races in italics indicate fastest lap)

References

External links 

 Profile on Red Bull Rookies Cup
 Profile on asiatalentcup.com

1997 births
Sportspeople from Surabaya
Javanese people
Indonesian motorcycle racers
Living people
Moto2 World Championship riders
Moto3 World Championship riders